Bankura Junction railway station is a railway junction station of Kharagpur–Bankura–Adra line and Bankura–Damodar Railway (Bankura–Masagram line) route under the Adra railway division of South Eastern Railway. It is situated at Lalbazar, Bankura town in Bankura district in the Indian state of West Bengal. Numerous express trains stop here.

Trains
Some of the major trains available from this railway station are as follows:
 New Delhi Bhubaneswar Rajdhani Express
 Yesvantpur–Kamakhya AC Superfast Express
 MGR Chennai Central–New Jalpaiguri Superfast Express
 Purulia–Villupuram Superfast Express
 Mumbai Lokmanya Tilak-Howrah Samarsata Express
 Porbandar–Santragachi Kavi Guru Express
 Puri Baidyanath Dham Express
 Puri–Jaynagar Express
 Puri–Kamakhya Express
 Puri-Anand Vihar Nandan Kanan Express
 Howrah–Purulia Express
 Digha–Malda Town Express
 Haldia–Asansol Express
 Digha–Asansol Express
 Howrah–Ranchi Intercity Express
 Santragachi-Purulia Rupasi Bangla Express
 Ernakulam-Patna Express
 Kolkata Shalimar- Bhojudih Aranyak Express
 Gomoh-Kharagpur Memu Express

History
Kharagpur–Bankura–Adra line was opened in 1901. This railway track including Bankura Junction railway station was electrified in 1997–98. Old narrow-gauge Bankura–Damodar Railway (also called as Bankura Damodar River Railway) connecting Bankura and Rainagar in Bankura and Bardhaman districts was opened to traffic in sections between 1916 and 1917. In 2005, the 118 kilometer-long railway section known as Bankura–Masagram line was converted to  broad gauge. The whole track was electrified in 2018–19.

References

Railway stations in Bankura district
Adra railway division
Railway junction stations in West Bengal
Bankura